Viktor Ignatov (born 15 October 1968, Novosibirsk) is a Russian political figure and a deputy of 7th and 8th State Dumas. 

After graduating from the university in 1993, Ignatov started working as an assistant to the deputy of the State Duma Ivan Starikov. On 21 December 1997 Ignatov was elected deputy of the Novosibirsk Regional Council of Deputies of the 2nd convocation. In 2000 he was appointed the Advisor to the Governor of Novosibirsk Oblast. From 2001 to 2004, he was a member of the Federation Council from the Novosibirsk Oblast constituency. On 11 December 2005 he was elected deputy of the Novosibirsk Regional Council of Deputies of the 4th convocation. In May 2014, he became the first deputy to the Mayor of Novosibirsk. 

In September 2016, Ignatov was elected deputy of the 7th State Duma from the Novosibirsk Oblast constituency. Since September 2021, he has served as a deputy of the 8th State Duma.

References

1968 births
Living people
United Russia politicians
21st-century Russian politicians
Seventh convocation members of the State Duma (Russian Federation)
Eighth convocation members of the State Duma (Russian Federation)
Members of the Federation Council of Russia (after 2000)